Dark Places of the Heart (1966) is a novel by Australian writer Christina Stead. This novel is also known by the title Cotter's England.

Story outline

Set in post-war northern England the novel follows the fortunes of Nellie Cook, sister Peggy Cotter and brother Tom, and their familial and external relationships.

Critical reception

Writing in The Canberra Times, Neville Braybrooke notes that the book is a "masterly depiction of working class life, both in the north and south of England, it has a freshness of vision which makes it unique."

A reviewer in Kirkus Review was a little ambivalent about the book: "Like her best novel, it is a hurdy gurdy of domestic crises, strewn with slashing, colorful speech, vigorous rhythms and social detail. Yet it has a strangely melancholic air and an uncertain jumble of incidents, as if the author were never sure either of her descriptive powers or of the intended emotional design."

See also

 1966 in literature

References

Novels by Christina Stead
1966 Australian novels
Holt, Rinehart and Winston books